David Tidmarsh (born 2 May 1971) is a New Zealand former cricketer. He played in three first-class matches for Northern Districts in 1992/93. After his cricket career, he became an umpire.

See also
 List of Northern Districts representative cricketers

References

External links
 

1971 births
Living people
New Zealand cricketers
New Zealand cricket umpires
Northern Districts cricketers